"I Don't Give A" is a song by Madonna from her album MDNA

I Don't Give A  may also refer to:

"I Don't Give A" (Lisa Ajax song), 2017
 "I Don't Give A...", a song by Missio from their album Loner
 "I Don't Give A...", a song by Peaches from her album Fatherfucker

See also
 I Don't Give a Fuck (disambiguation)
 "I Don't Giva", a song by Kristinia DeBarge from Thinkin Out Loud
 "I Don't Give", a song by Avril Lavigne from Let Go
 "Just Don't Give a Fuck", a song by Eminem